Merocyanines are a class of polymethine dyes which are clearly defined by set structural properties. Merycyanines belong to the group of dyes referred to as functional dyes, where their applications are not only determined by their colour, but also their valuable chemical properties. 

These dyes are usually intensely colored and have large extinction coefficients.

Merocyanine 540 was the first fluorescent dye used for measuring membrane potential, while Brooker's merocyanine and related compounds are notable for their solvatochromatic properties.

Definition 

Conventionally, merocyanine class includes streptocyanines and their analogues where both the nitrogen atom and carbonyl group (or any other electron-withdrawing group containing a multiple carbon-heteroatomic bond, e.g. amino group) can form part of a heterocyclic system. Like ionic cyanines, merocyanines contain two terminal heteroatoms and a polymethine chain in their chromophores.

See also
 Brooker's merocyanine
 Cyanine
 J-aggregate

References

Cyanine dyes
Benzoxazoles
Lactams
Sulfonates
Thiobarbiturates
Butyl compounds